The 1910 All-Western college football team consists of American football players selected to the All-Western teams chosen by various selectors for the 1910 college football season.

All-Western selections

Ends
 Stanfield Wells, Michigan (ECP, WE-1)
 Stanley Borleske, Michigan (WE-1)
 Otto E. Seiler, Illinois (ECP)
 Arthur Berndt, Indiana (WE-2)
 James Dean, Wisconsin (WE-2)

Tackles
 William P. Edmunds, Michigan (WE-1)
 James Walker, Minnesota (ECP, WE-1)
 Homer W. Dutter, Indiana (ECP, WE-2)
 Sylvester V. Shonka, Nebraska (WE-2)

Guards
 Albert Benbrook, Michigan (ECP, WE-1) (CFHOF)
 Glenn D. Butzer, Illinois (ECP, WE-1)
 Paul E. Belting, Illinois (WE-2)
 Ernest W. Baldwin, Michigan Agricultural (WE-2)

Centers
 John F. Twist, Illinois (ECP, WE-1)
 Sydney M. Collins, Nebraska (WE-2)

Quarterbacks
 John McGovern, Minnesota (ECP, WE-1) (CFHOF)
 Shorty McMillan, Michigan (WE-2)

Halfbacks
 Joe Magidsohn, Michigan (ECP, WE-1)
 Otto E. Seiler, Illinois (WE-1)
 Thomas Andrew Gill, Indiana (WE-2)
 Reuben Martin Rosenwald, Minnesota (ECP, WE-2)

Fullbacks 
 Lisle Alexander Johnston, Minnesota (ECP, WE-1)
 Leon Exelby, Michigan Agricultural (WE-2)

Key
Bold = consensus choice by a majority of the selectors

ECP = E. C. Patterson in Collier's Weekly

WE = Walter Eckersall in the Chicago Tribune

CFHOF = College Football Hall of Fame

See also
1910 College Football All-America Team

References

1910 Western Conference football season
All-Western college football teams